Prostanthera stenophylla  is a species of flowering plant in the family Lamiaceae and is endemic to Wollemi National Park in New South Wales. It is an erect, slender, aromatic shrub with hairy, oblong leaves and small groups of pale bluish mauve to violet flowers.

Description
The leaves are narrow egg-shaped to narrow elliptic but appear oblong due to the edge being curved downwards or rolled under. Flowering occurs in most months with a peak flowering in spring.

Taxonomy
Prostanthera stenophylla was first formally described by Barry Conn of the National Herbarium of New South Wales in the journal Telopea in 2006 from specimens collected near Dunns Swamp in 1996. He held it to be allied to the granite mintbush (Prostanthera granitica). The latter species is similar in appearance but has stiffer, rougher hairs and broader leaves.

The first recorded collection of plant material from the type locality was by nurseryman George Althofer in 1952. A 1937 collection by Lindsay Pryor is recognised as this species, but the given locality of "Canberra district" is believed to be incorrect. The specific epithet (stenophylla) refers to the narrow leaves of this shrub species.

Distribution and habitat
This mintbush is only known from the Wollemi National Park where it is found in sclerophyll forest dominated by black cypress pine (Callitris endlicheri), snappy gum (Eucalyptus rossii) and Sydney peppermint (E. piperita), growing in sandstone outcrops that are colloquially known as 'pagodas'.

Use in horticulture
This species has been in limited cultivation for some years. The unofficial name of Prostanthera rylstonii has been used by plant nurseries since at least 2005.

References

stenophylla
Flora of New South Wales
Lamiales of Australia
Plants described in 2006
Taxa named by Barry John Conn